Karolis is a Lithuanian masculine given name. It is a cognate of the North Germanic names Karl and Carl and the French and English Charles.

Karolis may refer to:
Karolis Babkauskas (born 1991), Lithuanian basketball player
Karolis Bauža (born 1987), Lithuanian judoka
Karolis Chvedukas (born 1991), Lithuanian footballer
Karolis Giedraitis (born 1998), Lithuanian basketball player
Karolis Girulis (born 1986), Lithuanian sports shooter
Karolis Jasaitis (born 1982), Lithuanian footballer
Karolis Jukšta (born 2003), Lithuanian chess player 
Karolis Laukžemis (born 1992), Lithuanian footballer
Karolis Lukošiūnas (born 1997), Lithuanian basketball player
Karolis Navickas (born 1990), Lithuanian rugby union player
Karolis Petrukonis (born 1987), Lithuanian basketball player
Karolis Požela (1896–1926), Lithuanian communist revolutionary
Karolis Skinkys (born 1989), Lithuanian football executive and sporting director 
Karolis Uzėla (born 2000), Lithuanian footballer
Karolis Zlatkauskas (born 1985), Lithuanian biathlete

See also

Karoli (name)
Karolos

Lithuanian masculine given names